Port Charlotte High School (PCHS) is a four-year, comprehensive, U.S. public high school located in Port Charlotte, Florida. The school opened in 1981, graduated its first class in 1984, its mascot is the pirate, and the school motto is "Yes, I am a Pirate." It is operated by Charlotte County Public Schools.

At one point in time, Port Charlotte High School was the largest high school in Charlotte County, with 2,082 students enrolled in grades Grades 9 through 12. Enrollment was traditionally based on students' geographic locations, but is now by choice under the more recently created open enrollment program.

The school has grown much, and it survived Hurricane Charley in 2004 and Hurricane Ian in 2022. The school's main feeders are Murdock Middle School, Port Charlotte Middle School, and Punta Gorda Middle School. The school's top athletic rivals are Charlotte High School and Lemon Bay High School. PCHS has educated two National Football League players and one Major League Baseball player who also played in the 2008 Summer Olympics.

History
PCHS has experienced growth through its twenty-five years of existence. The campus structure has grown with the population. The school was originally built in 1981, and opened its doors that year for 9th and 10th graders. For each of the next two years, a class was added, and PCHS graduated its first class in 1984. The original "G" and "B" buildings were completed in 1983. The auditorium was built in 1984. The science building, also known as A building, was built in 1987. The BB building was built in 1990. A swimming pool was added in 1991. The "C building", which houses the library and some classrooms, was built in 2001. In 2003, the new "B building", the two story academic classroom building, was finished. In 2007, the new gym was finished. The new gym did not replace the older one, but rather, was an addition.

Hurricanes Charley, Frances, & Ivan
In August 2004, Hurricane Charley brought devastation to the Port Charlotte region. Although Port Charlotte High School suffered only minor damage from the hurricane, other regional high schools suffered significant damage. In the aftermath, Port Charlotte High School shared its facility with the students of Charlotte High School, with Port Charlotte High School students attending morning class and Charlotte High School students attending in the evening.  Later in September, Hurricane Frances and Hurricane Ivan prompted Charlotte County Schools to be closed once again. In total, the three hurricanes caused students to miss 13 days of school during the 2004–2005 school year, requiring make-up days that infringed on student and staff days-off.

Recognition
In 2009, Port Charlotte High School was recognized by U.S. News & World Report as one of America's best high schools and a "Bronze Medal School"  for academic excellence. PCHS was one of 1,189 schools nationwide to receive a bronze medal.

COVID-19
During the COVID-19 pandemic, the Charlotte County Public Schools system reopened, albeit delayed, for the 2020–2021 school year after closing in spring during the 2019–2020 school year at the order of Governor Ron DeSantis. The school reported the first case of the virus among the school system during the pandemic on September 8, a day after school reopened. The school went on to record at least 75 cases of the virus in students and staff, more than any other school in the county. Unlike the previous school year, in which graduation ceremonies were thrown into turmoil due to the pandemic, Port Charlotte High School hosted a graduation ceremony at Charlotte Sports Park, and it served as a test for other Charlotte County schools to do the same.

In the subsequent school year, still amidst the COVID-19 pandemic, the Charlotte County Public Schools system reopened once again, this time during a surge of the virus throughout the state, including in Charlotte County. Unlike the beginning of the previous school year, some teachers and students would be vaccinated against the disease, but not all. In total, 276 cases of the virus were reported among students and staff from the day the school reopened on August 10, with the first case being reported the very day the school reopened.

While COVID-19 cases were initially reported for the 2022–2023 school year, the dashboard which Charlotte County Public Schools ran was eventually phased out.

Hurricanes Ian & Nicole 
In late September 2022, Hurricane Ian brought considerable wind as well as flooding and storm surge damage to the Port Charlotte region. All schools and ancillary facilities in the Charlotte County Public Schools system received considerable injury from Ian. However, Port Charlotte High School was one of the 19 schools able to re-open 3 weeks after the schools had been forced to close due to the storm. The school was closed for another day due to Hurricane Nicole in early November, which passed northeast of the school and brought tropical storm conditions to the area. In total, 16 school days were missed because of the systems during the 2022–2023 school year.

Academics
Port Charlotte High School currently has 15 English teachers, 17 math teachers, 8 intensive reading teachers, 14 science teachers, 15 social studies teachers, 8 foreign language teachers, 14 vocational teachers, 5 exceptional student education (for students with disabilities) teachers, and 1 ESOL teacher. There are seven periods in a school day. The school has a student/teacher ratio of 23.39. The curriculum is based on the Sunshine State Standards. Because of the impacts of the COVID-19 pandemic, the school grade for the 2019-2020 school year was not calculated by the Florida Department of Education.

These grades are based on FCAT and FSA testing.

Athletics

The PCHS athletic department operates programs in football, basketball, baseball, softball, track, cheerleading, golf, wrestling, soccer, volleyball, bowling, swimming, lacrosse, diving, cross country, and weightlifting. Athletics at PCHS are regulated by the Florida High School Athletic Association under classification 4A, district 11.

Extracurricular activities
Port Charlotte High School has many clubs and groups, including Academic Team Challenge (A-Team), Beta Club, Book Club, Creative Writing Club, Dance Team, DECA, Environmental Club, Fellowship of Christian Athletes (FCA), French Club, Games Club, Interact Club, Key Club, Mock Trial Team, Model United Nations (MUN), Mu Alpha Theta, National Art Honor Society, National Honor Society, Naval Junior Reserve Officers Training Corp (NJROTC), Pirate Crew, Pride of Port Charlotte Marching Band, Recruitment & Educational Assistance for Careers In Health (REACH), Red Cross Club, Scholars Club, Silver Cord, Spanish Club, Student Government Association, Thespian Society, Tri-M Music Society, Water Polo, and Yearbook Team. Key Club, an organization for high school students, is operated by the Kiwanis Club.

Model United Nations
Port Charlotte High School's Model United Nations Academic Team was ranked by the BEST DELEGATE website as the number five best Model UN team in America for the 2010–2011 school year.

The school's Model United Nations (MUN) is the most successful competitive team of any kind in Charlotte County history. For almost two decades, the PCHS Model United Nations Academic Team has been recognized as one of the very best Model UN teams in the country or its winning performances at conferences at both the national and international levels.  In 2012, PCHS MUN was ranked the fourth best Model United Nations team in the United States by Best Delegate, a Model United Nations Database recognized all over the world.

The team has won coveted Best Large School and Best Small School Awards at many national and international conferences, like Harvard (HMUN), Yale (YMUN), the University of Pennsylvania (ILMUNC), McGill University in Montreal, Canada (SSUNS), as well as multiple awards at other noteworthy conferences such as University of Chicago (MUNUC), Brown University (BMUN), Northwestern University (NUMUN, Georgia Tech (GTMUN), The College of William and Mary (WMHSMUN), Duke University, and the Southwest Florida/FGCU (SWFLMUN).

The team also does significant community outreach work. For the past 16 years team members have operated their award-winning International Market. They import and sell arts and crafts created by struggling indigenous artisans from all across the planet. They work closely with the Fair Trade Federation to ensure that all of the artists they work with are treated fairly and paid top wages for their creations. The team has sold well over $100,000 worth of arts and crafts. Their efforts keep people in the developing world solvent and ancient art forms alive.

Team members also put on a yearly Mini-Mun conference for students from local public and private middle schools. They also present six-week-long public speaking/debate seminars at several local elementary schools. The seminars culminate in a public debate between teams from the elementary schools. The event is attended by over 200 friends and relatives.

Naval Junior Reserve Officers' Training Corps

The Naval Junior Reserve Officers' Training Corps (NJROTC) is a program allowing high school students to participate in the academic and physical training aspect of naval service, while also providing leadership opportunities to those involved in the program. It does not require a commitment to military service following high school graduation. Port Charlotte's NJROTC program was established in the early 1990s; since then, it has grown significantly. The company of cadets are overseen and instructed by two retired United States Navy personnel, who are in turn overseen by the United States Navy itself through the form of Area Managers. Port Charlotte's unit is a member of NJROTC Area Seven, and is known for service to its community.

The Pirate NJROTC unit has received many awards over the years, including, but not limited to the "Distinguished Unit Award," which it has been awarded over seven consecutive academic years - 2001–2007. The unit is a part of Area 7, which consists of units in Alabama, Florida, and Georgia.

The unit has seven "teams" within its infrastructure that allow participating cadets to receive extracurricular training and experience of their choice: an armed and unarmed Drill Team, Color Guard, honor guard, academic team, orienteering team, marksmanship team and a physical training ("PT") team. The teams compete against other Area Seven units at colleges, universities, military installations, and other high schools. The teams also compete with other units across the United States.

Pride of Port Charlotte Bands
As of 2008, Port Charlotte High School's "Pride of Port Charlotte" Bands have consistently ranked among the top bands in the state of Florida for several years. The Pride of Port Charlotte Marching Band has participated at many famous events, such as the Fiesta Bowl, Macy's Thanksgiving Day Parade, the New York City Saint Patrick's Day Parade, the New Year's Day Parade in London, England, and the Cotton Bowl Parade in Dallas, Texas among many others. The Pride Concert and Jazz Bands are also extremely successful, consistently receiving superior ratings from the Florida Bandmasters Association.

Gay-Straight Alliance
Port Charlotte High School has a Gay-Straight Alliance club. The club was not well received by all of the students or the residents of largely conservative Charlotte County. When the club attracted protestors from Westboro Baptist Church in Topeka, Kansas, the club's leader failed to rally support from the student population, and some of the students even laughed at the situation.  Not long after the protests, the club was disbanded. As of the 2020–2021 school year the club once again exists in the school.

Demographics
As of the 2020–2021 school year, Port Charlotte High School hosted 1,374 students. Of the student body, 765 of the students were male and 609 were female. 324 were in ninth grade, 343 were in tenth grade, 329 were in eleventh grade, and 378 were in twelfth grade. 796 students were white, 271 were Hispanic, 195 were black, 75 were "two or more races," 30 were Asian, 5 were Native Hawaiian or Pacific Islander, and 2 were American Indian or Alaska Native.

Notable alumni
 Vinnie Fiorello, professional drummer with ska punk band Less Than Jake and business owner.
 John Hall, (class of 1991), professional football player in the NFL.
 Anthony Hargrove, (class of 2001), professional football player in the NFL.
 David Holmberg, (class of 2009), professional baseball pitcher in MLB.
 Matthew LaPorta, professional baseball player in MLB; attended PCHS his freshman year.
 Asher Levine, (class of 2006), fashion designer and business owner.

Notable faculty
 Doug Dunakey, professional golfer who became the golf coach for PCHS following his retirement.
Mark Ivey, college football coach who previously coached the freshman offensive and defensive line at PCHS.

See also

 Charlotte County, Florida

References

External links

 
 

High schools in Charlotte County, Florida
Public high schools in Florida
1982 establishments in Florida
Educational institutions established in 1982
School buildings completed in 1982
1980s architecture in the United States